Pedrini is an Italian surname. Notable people with the surname include:

Daniele Pedrini (born 1976), Italian ski mountaineer
Domenico Pedrini (1728–1800), Italian painter
Enrico Pedrini (1940–2012), Italian academic, theorist and art collector
Filippo Pedrini (1763–1856), Italian painter
Matteo Pedrini (born 2000), Italian footballer
Teodorico Pedrini (1671–1746), Italian Vincentian priest, missionary, musician, and composer 

Italian-language surnames
Surnames from given names